Kestenga, is a rural village in the Loukhsky District of the Republic of Karelia in Russia on the northern shore of Lake Topozero. 

It is the administrative centre of the Kestenga rural settlement. 
There is a railway station on the Loukhi-Pyaozersky line.
As of the 2013 Census, its population was 1,117. 

The village was at the center of the Battle of Kestenga in 1941 between the Finnish and Soviet Army during the Continuation War.

External link

Rural localities in the Republic of Karelia
Loukhsky District
Kemsky Uyezd
Former urban-type settlements of Karelia